The Rural Municipality of White Valley No. 49 is a rural municipality (RM) in the Canadian province of Saskatchewan within Census Division No. 4 and  Division No. 3. It is located in the southwest portion of the province near Eastend.

History 
The RM of White Valley No. 49 incorporated as a rural municipality on January 1, 1913.

Geography

Communities and localities 
The following urban municipalities are surrounded by the RM.

Towns
Eastend

The following unincorporated communities are within the RM.

Localities
Bench
Chambery
East Fairwell
Klintonel
Knollys
Neighbour
Olga
Ravenscrag

Demographics 

Government 
The RM of White Valley No. 49 is governed by an elected municipal council and an appointed administrator that meets on the second Thursday of every month. The reeve of the RM is James Leroy while its administrator is Edna Laturnus. The RM's office is located in Eastend.

Transportation

See also 
List of rural municipalities in Saskatchewan
List of communities in Saskatchewan

References 

White Valley
 
Division No. 4, Saskatchewan